Joseph William Patterson Jr. (August 20, 1918 – July 10, 1998) was an American football player who played two seasons in the NFL with the Chicago Cardinals and Pittsburgh Steelers.

Early life
Patterson was born in Hillsboro, Texas and attended Hillsboro High School. He was inducted into the Texas High School Football Hall of Fame in 1988.

He matriculated at Baylor University. He was named to Baylor's 1930s All-Decade Team and was the 1939 East–West Shrine Game MVP. He was inducted into the Baylor Hall of Fame in 1963.

Football  career
Patterson was drafted by the Pittsburgh Pirates in the third round of the 1939 NFL Draft.   He played for the Chicago Cardinals in 1939 and returned to the Steelers in 1940.   He played quarterback,  halfback and  punted.

Personal

See also
 List of college football yearly passing leaders

References

1918 births
1998 deaths
People from Hillsboro, Texas
Players of American football from Texas
American football quarterbacks
American football running backs
Baylor Bears football players
Chicago Cardinals players
Pittsburgh Steelers players
Georgia Pre-Flight Skycrackers football players